Atelopus sanjosei is a species of toad in the family Bufonidae endemic to Colombia. It is only known from its type locality in Anorí, Antioquia Department, on the Cordillera Occidental.
Its natural habitats are tropical moist lowland forests near streams.
It is threatened by habitat loss, water pollution by mining and development for mining; it is a lowland species. It is considered rare and has not been sighted since 1988.

References

sanjosei
Amphibians of Colombia
Endemic fauna of Colombia
Taxa named by Juan A. Rivero
Taxa named by Marco Antonio Serna Díaz
Amphibians described in 1989
Taxonomy articles created by Polbot